"Blood Makes Noise" is a song written and performed by American singer-songwriter Suzanne Vega. It was released as the second single from her fourth album, 99.9F°, in August 1992. It debuted at number 14 on the US Billboard Modern Rock Tracks chart and reached number one a month later.

Content
The song is notable for its clangy percussion, which has been compared to industrial music. Vega said that the percussion was meant to recreate the sounds the "blood makes" in someone's head when someone's afraid and that she had never heard of industrial music. The song doesn't clarify what the fear is in response to, but some have argued the song is about a patient taking an AIDS test. Suzanne Vega has denied this; in a 2001 interview with The A.V. Club, she says she likes "to take a moment out of its context. It makes you identify with it, without knowing why. In a way, its kind of eerie, because it means you can hear the song, identify with it, and not really know what the circumstances are. And in some ways, that's more satisfying to me."

Music video
The music video was directed by Nico Beyer. It was added to MTV the week of August 29, 1992. The video was featured on Beavis and Butt-Head.

Charts

Release history

References

External links
 

1992 songs
1992 singles
A&M Records singles
Song recordings produced by Mitchell Froom
Suzanne Vega songs